Macalelon, officially the Municipality of Macalelon,  is a 4th class municipality in the province of Quezon, Philippines. According to the 2020 census, it has a population of 27,312 people.

The Tikoy Festival (rice cake) and the Kubol Festival are well known for this town.

Geography

Barangays
Macalelon is politically subdivided into 30 barangays.

Climate

Demographics

Economy

Tourism

Immaculate Conception Parish Church
Coral stone blocks make up this edifice which was erected 1854. Flanked by two small belfries, it projects a quaint but grand appeal. Good to note that a flight of stairs precedes the church, since it is situated on top of a small hill. A usual location for churches in coastal towns.

Communication
All major networks are available in the municipality: Globe, Smart and Dito; also fixed landlines by SANTELCOR.

Education
High schools
Calantas National High School (CNHS)
Macalelon High School (MHS)
Mary Immaculate Parochial School (MIPS)
Olongtao National High School (ONHS)

References

External links
Macalelon Profile at PhilAtlas.com
[ Philippine Standard Geographic Code]
Philippine Census Information
Local Governance Performance Management System

Municipalities of Quezon